John Ortberg, Jr. (born May 5, 1957) is an American evangelical Christian author, speaker, and the former senior pastor of Menlo Church in Menlo Park, California, an ECO Presbyterian church with more than 4,000 members. Ortberg has published many books including the 2008 ECPA Christian Book Award winner When the Game is Over, It All Goes Back in the Box, and the 2002 Christianity Today Book Award winner If You Want to Walk on Water, You've Got to Get Out of the Boat. Another of his publications, The Life You've Always Wanted, has sold more than 500,000 copies as of 2008. On August 13, 2012, Ortberg's book Who Is This Man? debuted at #3 on the New Release chart at Amazon.com.

Ortberg resigned from his position as pastor of Menlo Church in Summer 2020 after it was revealed that he had allowed one of his sons, John Ortberg III, to continue volunteering in working with minors at the church after the son had disclosed having experienced unwanted thoughts of attraction to minors. The allegations had arisen in late 2019, initially without identifying Ortberg's son as the volunteer in question.

Background 
Ortberg was born in Rockford, Illinois. He earned his undergraduate degree from Wheaton College, and his M.Div. and Ph.D. in clinical psychology from Fuller Theological Seminary. Ortberg has also studied at the University of Aberdeen, Scotland. From 1985 to 1990, he served as senior pastor at Simi Valley Community Church, and then from 1990 to 1994 at Horizons Community Church (now Baseline Community Church) in Claremont, California. Ortberg then moved from California to Illinois to serve as a teaching pastor at Willow Creek Community Church in South Barrington, Illinois until 2003, when he became the senior pastor at Menlo Park Presbyterian Church, a multi-campus church in Northern California.

Ortberg's wife, Nancy, has also served as a pastor. They have three children: Laura, Daniel, and John III. Laura has written for The New York Times, New York Magazine, and BuzzFeed. Daniel M. Lavery is the founder, writer and editor of the now-defunct feminist humor blog The Toast and was the author of the "Dear Prudence" advice column for the Slate online magazine from November 2015 until May 2021. Their youngest, John III, known as Johnny, was an Ultimate Frisbee coach until late 2019.

Teachings

Spiritual formation
A central theme of Ortberg's teaching and books is spiritual formation, the transforming of human character through authentic experiences with God. Ortberg argues that the desire for comfort and security often stands in the way of an authentic relationship with God when people place too high a value on being secure and comfortable they may be reluctant to make the sacrifices God asks of them.

Eternal cravings
Ortberg has warned against the societal pressures which tell people that bigger is always better, saying, "I think for all of us, whatever your ministry or job, bigness will never satisfy the call." In his books, Ortberg has described his own desire for importance and success, and how achieving them did not ultimately bring him happiness. "Your cravings," according to Ortberg, "if you could get to the bottom of them, are for the eternal."

In media
Ortberg's retelling of his experience of playing Monopoly with his grandmother was used as the beginning narration of Peter Joseph's 2011 documentary Zeitgeist: Moving Forward.

Speaking 

Ortberg has been a featured speaker at many events, including:

 Promise Keepers 2006 Conferences
 Westmont College (2007 commencement speaker)

Leave and resignation
In the summer of 2018, Ortberg's son, John III, confessed to him that he was sexually attracted to minors. At that time, Ortberg did nothing to ensure that his son stopped his volunteer activities with minors at Menlo Church. Ortberg also did not alert other church leaders to the situation.

Ortberg's other son, Daniel Lavery, posted on Twitter in 2020 that a member of his father's church had disclosed his 'obsessive sexual feelings about young children' to Lavery on November 15, 2019. Upon discovering that his father had not shared this information with Menlo Church Leadership or the Elder Board, Lavery went to the church's leadership himself.

On November 22, 2019, Ortberg went on leave from his position. The reason for his leave was not stated at that time.

On January 21, 2020, Menlo Church issued a statement indicating the reason Ortberg was placed on leave: he had allowed a church volunteer (John III was not named in that statement) to work with children, despite that volunteer's confession of a lifelong sexual attraction to children. Ortberg was reinstated after an investigation found no evidence of wrongdoing.

On January 24, 2020, Ortberg returned from leave. He has stated that he "failed to do the right thing" and apologized for his "lack of transparency". After completing a restoration plan, Ortberg returned to the pulpit on March 7, 2020.

Lavery alleged that this investigation was inadequate, because the lawyer who conducted it had no experience with matters of sexual misconduct, but rather was a specialist in protecting clients from litigation. 

On July 29, 2020, Menlo Church announced that Ortberg had resigned from his position, effective August 2, 2020, citing broken trust and fallout from the “poor judgement” in decisions he had made in allowing his son to continue to volunteer with students after his confession of an attraction to minors. In October 2021, the third-party organization Zero Abuse Project completed an investigation into the matter after interviewing 104 witnesses and reviewing or analyzing more than 500,000 documents. Zero Abuse Project did not find any disclosure or other evidence that Ortberg III committed any acts of wrongdoing against a minor.

Works published as author
Grace: An Invitation to a Way of Life (with Laurie Pederson and Judson Poling). Zondervan, 2000 
If You Want to Walk on Water, You've Got to Get Out of the Boat. Zondervan, 2001 
Love Beyond Reason. Zondervan, 2001 
The Life You've Always Wanted. Zondervan, 2002 
Everybody's Normal Till You Get To Know Them. Zondervan, 2003 
Living the God Life: Finding God's Extraordinary Love in Your Ordinary Life. Inspirio, 2004, 
God Is Closer Than You Think: If God is Always with Us, why is He So Hard to Find? Zondervan, 2005 
Now What?: God's Guide to Life for Graduates. Zondervan, 2005 
When the Game Is Over, It All Goes Back in the Box. Zondervan, 2007 
Know Doubt. Zondervan, 2008 
The Me I Want To Be: Becoming God's Best Version of You. Zondervan, 2010 
Who Is This Man?: The Unpredictable Impact of the Inescapable Jesus. Zondervan, 2012 
Soul Keeping: Caring For the Most Important Part of You. Zondervan, 2014 
 The foreword for 
Eternity is Now In Session: A radical rediscovery of what Jesus really taught about salvation, eternity, and getting to the Good Place. Tyndale, 2018

References

External links 
 John Ortberg Official Site 
 Official Publisher Site

Living people
1957 births
Christian writers
American Presbyterian ministers
Promise Keepers
Writers from Rockford, Illinois
Wheaton College (Illinois) alumni
Fuller Theological Seminary alumni
American evangelicals
People from Menlo Park, California
American religious writers
20th-century American male writers
20th-century American non-fiction writers
21st-century American male writers
21st-century American non-fiction writers
American male non-fiction writers
Writers from California
Religious leaders from Illinois
Religious leaders from California